Henry A. Staab (born April 19, 1875 in Milwaukee, Wisconsin), was a member of the Wisconsin State Assembly. A member of the Knights of Pythias, he would become Grand Chancellor of Wisconsin.

Career
Staab was elected to the Assembly in 1924 and re-elected in 1926. Additionally, he was appointed to the Milwaukee Motion Picture Commission in 1920. He was a Republican.

References

Politicians from Milwaukee
Republican Party members of the Wisconsin State Assembly
1875 births
Year of death missing